Ricfried was a 9th and 10th century count in Betuwe (Batavia) now in the Netherlands, and possibly also some neighboring areas such as the Duffelgau, now in Germany. He was ancestor of a family referred to as the "Balderics" because it included several powerful bishops of this name. It is also proposed by historians such as Leon Vanderkindere that he is probably ancestor of the Counts of Loon (Looz) in modern Belgian Limburg.

Life
He was mentioned in an 897 charter by Zwentibold, King of Lotharingia, as a Count with possessions in Betuwe.

He was also known as Count Dodo (comitatu Dodonis), his memorial calling him "Ricfridus hoc nomine Dodo vocatus … comes".  The memorial names presul Baldricus … preses Rodolphus … victor Yrimfredus pariterque comes Nevelongus [prelate Balderic, governor Rudolph, victor Ehrenfried and count Nebelung] as his children.  Virtually all that we know about Ricfried is based on this memorial and the one charter which mentions him.

The biography of Bishop Balderic I of Utrecht states that “he was the son of Count Ricfried in the Betuwe, who expelled the Vikings from Utrecht, after which Balderic, who like his immediate predecessors had resided in Deventer, was able to move the bishopric back to Utrecht.”  Balderic is also identified as a cousin of Gilbert, Duke of Lorraine, and uncle of Baldrick I, Bishop of Liège.

Family
Ricfried married Herensinda, from an unknown family.  They had five children:
Count Nevelung (died before 943). Jongbloed (2016) suggests he was part of the Regnarid rebellion which ended with the Battle of Andernach.
"Victor" or "Rector" Iremfrid (died after 966). Apparently known for military prowess at his father's death, but not yet a count. Jongbloed (2016) believes he must have taken over Nevelung's inheritance.
"Preses" Rudolfe. Leon Vanderkindere proposed that he was Bishop of Laon. Jongbloed (2016) argues that the grave record shows he was a Count, with a wife and offspring. Aarts (1994) thinks praeses refers to the military "prefecture" known in this area which had historically suffered from Viking raids.
Balderic, Bishop of Utrecht.
An otherwise unknown daughter was proposed by Vanderkindere to have married Lambert. However this was part of a complex scenario which is no longer widely accepted.

According to Jongbloed, Ricfried was succeeded by his son Nevelung as Count of Betuwe upon his death. However he had also died by 943.

Sources 

Aarts, Bas (1994) "Ansfried, graaf en bisschop. Een stand van zaken", in: J. Coolen en J. Forschelen (ed.), Opera Omnia II. Een verzameling geschied- en heemkundige opstellen, 7-85
Vanderkindere, L. (1900) ‘A propos d´une charte de Baldéric d’Utrecht’, Académie royale de Belgique Bulletin de la Classe des Lettres et des Sciences Morales et Politiques (Bruxelles), 
Weigle, Fritz, Balderich, Neue Deutsche Biographie, Berlin: Duncker & Humblot, 1953
Jongbloed, Hein H., (2006), "Immed “von Kleve” (um 950) – Das erste Klevische Grafenhaus (ca. 885-ca. 1015) als Vorstufe des geldrischen Fürstentums", Annalen des Historischen Vereins für den Niederrhein, Heft 209 
Jongbloed, Hein H., (2009) "Listige Immo en Herswind. Een politieke wildebras in het Maasdal (938-960) en zijn in Thorn rustende dochter", Jaarboek. Limburgs Geschied- en Oudheidkundig Genootschap vol. 145 (2009) p. 9-67
Vanderkindere, Léon, La Formation territoriale des principautés belges au Moyen Âge, Bruxelles, H. Lamertin, 1902 
Warner, David A., Ottonian Germany. The Chronicon of Thietmar of Merseburg. Manchester, 2001

External links
 Medieval Lands Project, Graven van Betuwe

Medieval Dutch nobility